Sarcostemma is a formerly recognized genus  of flowering plants in the dogbane family, Apocynaceae, first described as a genus in 1810. The name is derived from the Greek words σαρκὸς (sarkos), meaning "flesh," and 	στέμμα (stemma), meaning "garland". Members of the genus were known generally as climbing milkweeds or caustic bushes. The genus Sarcostemma has been shown to be nested within the genus Cynanchum, and in 2012 Sarcostemma was put into synonymy with Cynanchum.

Selected former species
Moved to other genera (Cynanchum, Funastrum, Leptadenia, Philibertia, Tetraphysa).

References

External links
Jepson Manual Treatment
Sarcostemma in Australia
Sarcostemma in California

Asclepiadoideae
Taxonomy articles created by Polbot
Historically recognized angiosperm genera